Manorama Weekly is a weekly Malayalam language local interest magazine published by Manorama Group of publications from Kottayam, India. It started publishing on 8 August 1937. With a circulation of 5,82,180 copies (as per July–December 2010 survey by Audit Bureau of Circulation), it is the largest selling weekly in India. Along with Mangalam Weekly, it is the most popular magazine among Keralites, especially among homemakers. They have acquired the collective sobriquet of "Ma" publications on account of their name and content.

References

External links
 Official website

Weekly magazines published in India
Local interest magazines
Malayalam-language magazines
Magazines established in 1937
Malayala Manorama group
Mass media in Kerala
1937 establishments in India